Alone Together is an extended play (EP) by British singer-songwriter Daley. His sound combines soulful vocals and songwriting with hip hop and experimental production and has previously been described as "future throwback soul". The EP's lead single is the track "Remember Me" featuring Jessie J. The EP was released on iTunes on 6 November 2012 in United States and on 2 December 2012 in United Kingdom.

Track listing

Weekly charts

Release history

References

External links
www.daley.tv — official website

2012 EPs
Daley (musician) albums
Polydor Records EPs
Universal Republic Records albums